The World Shooting Para Sport Championships, originally known as the IPC Shooting World Championships, are the world championships for shooting where athletes with a disability compete. They are organised by the International Paralympic Committee (IPC) on a four year rotation with the Paralympic Games.

The Championships are open to both men and women, with two main classifications, SH1 and SH2. SH1 classification shooting events include pistols and rifles, while SH2 events are rifles only.

The IPC, which serves as the international governing body for shooting involving competitors with disabilities, changed the sport's name to "shooting Para sport" effective 30 November 2016. At the same time, it adopted the "World Para" branding for the committees that govern all disability sports for which it serves as the international federation, including shooting.

History

References

External links
World Shooting Para Sport home page

 
Parasports world championships
Recurring sporting events established in 1994